Leslie Charteris (born Leslie Charles Bowyer Yin; 1907–1993) was a British-American writer best known for his series on stories featuring Simon Templar, also known as The Saint. Born in Singapore to a Chinese father, Suat Yin Chwan, and his English wife, Lydia ( Bowyer), Charteris travelled extensively with his family until beginning his education in England in 1919. In 1925 he enrolled at King's College, Cambridge, but left after a year in order to become a writer; to support himself, he worked as a goldminer, bartender, professional bridge player and temporary policeman. In October 1926 he changed his name by deed poll to Leslie Charles Bowyer Charteris-Ian, and professionally used the shorter version, Leslie Charteris.

Charteris's first novel, X Esquire, which he later described as "an appallingly bad book", was published in 1927; his second novel—The White Rider, published in 1928—is "overwritten and poorly constructed", according to his biographer Joan DelFattore.

Charteris continued writing Saint books and the series gained in popularity because of its "mix of light humour, sophisticated settings, and story-line emphasising the role of a crusader tackling the forces of evil", which had "special appeal in the depression". Charteris moved to the United States in 1932 and soon began writing screenplays, the first of which resulted in Midnight Club, released in 1933.

Charteris also worked on three books of non-fiction and an introduction to the 1980 re-issue of The Saint Meets the Tiger. The works consisted of a translation from Spanish to English of the autobiography of the bullfighter Juan Belmonte, a language guide to Spanish, and a guide to Paleneo, a wordless, pictorial sign language invented by Charteris. He died in Windsor, Berkshire, in April 1993.

Novels and story collections

Screenplays

Non-fiction

Notes and references
Notes

References

Sources

External links
 

Bibliographies of British writers